Pouteria puberula is a species of plant in the family Sapotaceae. It is endemic to Venezuela.

References

Flora of Venezuela
puberula
Vulnerable plants
Taxonomy articles created by Polbot